This is a list of diseases of foliage plants belonging to the family Araucariaceae.

Plant species

Fungal diseases

References
Common Names of Diseases, The American Phytopathological Society

Foliage plant (Araucariacea)